Dierckx or Dierkx is a Dutch patronymic surname based on a short form of Diederik. It is most common in the Belgian province of Antwerp. People with this surname include:
 Leo Dierckx (born 1943), Belgian volleyball player
  (1866–1900), Dutch canonized nun and missionary in China known as Marie Adolphine
 Octave Dierckx (1882–1955), Belgian liberal and politician
 Pieter Franciscus Dierckx (1871–1950), Belgian impressionist painter
 Tuur Dierckx (born 1995), Belgian football striker

See also
 Léon Dierx (1838–1912), French poet
 Dierickx, surname of the same origin

References

Dutch-language surnames
Patronymic surnames
Surnames of Belgian origin
Surnames from given names

de:Dierckx